is a Japanese professional shogi player, ranked 9-dan. He is a former Meijin and Kiō title holder.

Early life
Maruyama was born in Kisarazu, Chiba on September 5, 1970. He won the 9th  in 1984, and the following year entered the Japan Shogi Association's apprentice school at the rank of 6-kyū as a protegee of shogi professional . He was promoted to the rank of 1-dan in 1986 and achieved professional status and the rank of 4-dan in April 1990.

Shogi professional
Maruyama's first tournament championship as a professional came in came in 1994 when he defeated Masataka Gōda 2 games to none to win the 25th  tournament. Maruyama successfully defended his championship the following year by defeating Kōichi Fukaura 2 games to 1 in the 26th Shinjin-Ō match which made him the first person to win the tournament in consecutive years. Maruyama, however, was unable to repeat his success for a third consecutive year when he lost the 27th Shinjin-Ō match 2 games to 1 to Takeshi Fujii in 1996 .

Maruyama's first appearance in a major title match came in 1999 when he challenged Yoshiharu Habu for the 47th Ōza title. Maruyama lost the match 3 games to 1.

Theoretical contributions
Maruyama invented the Maruyama Vaccine (丸山ワクチン maruyama wakuchin) variation for Static Rook positions playing against Cheerful Central Rook opponents.

Promotion history
The promotion history for Maruyama is as follows:
 6-kyū: 1985
 1-dan: 1986
 4-dan: April 1, 1990
 5-dan: April 1, 1992
 6-dan: April 1, 1995
 7-dan: April 1, 1997
 8-dan: April 1, 1998
 9-dan: June 28, 2000

Titles and other championships
Maruyama has appeared in major title matches a total of ten times and has won three major titles. In addition to major titles, he has won twelve other shogi championships during his career.

Major titles

Other championships

Note: Tournaments marked with an asterisk (*) are no longer held.

Awards and honors
Maruyama has received a number of awards and honors throughout his career for his accomplishments both on an off the shogi board. These include the Annual Shogi Awards given out by the JSA for performance in official games as well as other JSA awards for career accomplishments, and awards received from governmental organizations, etc. for contributions made to Japanese society.

Annual Shogi Awards
22nd Annual Awards (April 1994March 1995): Best New Player, Most Consecutive Games Won
23rd Annual Awards (April 1995March 1996): Most Games Won, Most Consecutive Games Won
27th Annual Awards (April 1999March 2000): Most Games Won, Most Games Played, Most Consecutive Games Won, Technique Award
28th Annual Awards (April 2000March 2001): Distinguished Service Award
30th Annual Awards (April 2002March 2003): Distinguished Service Award
39th Annual Awards (April 2011March 2012): Game of the Year
46th Annual Awards (April 2018March 2019): Masuda Special Prize

Other awards
2000, November: Kisarazu City Meritorius Citizen Award
2007: Shogi Honor Fighting-spirit Award (Awarded by JSA in recognition of winning 600 official games as a professional)
2014: Shogi Honor Fighting-spirit Award (Awarded by JSA in recognition of winning 800 official games as a professional)
2015: 25 Years Service Award (Awarded by the JSA in recognition of being an active professional for twenty-five years)

Year-end prize money and game fee ranking
Maruyama has finished in the "Top 10" of the JSA's  seventeen times since 1993. His highest finish was third in 2001 with in JPY 57,270,000 in earnings.

References

External links
ShogiHub: Professional Player Info · Maruyama, Tadahisa

1970 births
People from Kisarazu
Japanese shogi players
Living people
Professional shogi players
Meijin (shogi)
Kiō
Waseda University alumni
Professional shogi players from Chiba Prefecture
Shinjin-Ō